The area to the north and northwest of the centre of the city of Derby, England, contains 76 listed buildings that are recorded in the National Heritage List for England.   Of these, three are listed at Grade I, the highest of the three grades, ten are at Grade II*, the middle grade, and the others are at Grade II, the lowest grade.  The area is largely residential, and it contains some industry, mainly in former silk mills, and the Midland Railway had a goods yard in the area.  Most of the listed buildings are houses and associated structures.  Some of the former mills are listed, together with buildings in the Midland Railway goods yard.  The other listed buildings include churches and chapels, public houses and a hotel, shops, bridges, the remains of a cross, a well, a convent, street bollards, war memorials and a telephone kiosk.


Key

Buildings

References

Citations

Sources

 

Lists of listed buildings in Derbyshire
Listed buildings in Derby